Donatelli is an Italian surname. Notable people with this name include:
Augie Donatelli (1914–1990), American baseball umpire
Carmine Crocco (1830–1905), also known as Carmine Crocco Donatelli, Italian brigand
Clark Donatelli (born 1965), American ice hockey player and coach
Denise Donatelli (born 1950), American jazz singer
Eden Donatelli (born 1970), Canadian short track speed skater and coach
Fanny Salvini-Donatelli (c. 1815 – 1891), Italian operatic soprano
Franco Donatelli (1924–1995), Italian comic book artist
Frank Donatelli (born 1949), American political operative
Gary Donatelli (born 1951), American television soap opera director
Raquel Donatelli, American reality television performer
Susanna Donatelli (born 1960), Italian computer scientist
Tony Donatelli (born 1984), American soccer player

Italian-language surnames